Arkady Svistunov (born 28 April 1965, Donetsk) is a Russian political figure and a deputy of the 5th and 8th State Dumas.
 
After graduating from the Higher School of the KGB in 1990, Svistunov worked in a number of enterprises, including the Center-service, Volga-Kama Bank, Commercial Mortgage and Investment Bank Sochi. In 2002, he was appointed Vice-President of the Promsvyazbank. Later he headed the Department of Regional Development of the Commercial Mortgage and Investment Bank Sochi. In 2007, he was elected deputy of the 5th State Duma. In 2021, he was re-elected for the 8th State Duma.

References
 

 

1965 births
Living people
Liberal Democratic Party of Russia politicians
21st-century Russian politicians
Eighth convocation members of the State Duma (Russian Federation)
Fifth convocation members of the State Duma (Russian Federation)
Politicians from Donetsk